Coralliophila amirantium is a species of sea snail, a marine gastropod mollusk, in the family Muricidae, the murex snails or rock snails.

References

amirantium
Gastropods described in 1884